Jan Karafiát was a Czechoslovakian gymnast.  

A member of the 1924 Czechoslovakian Olympic team,  Karafiát's most significant competitive achievements took place at the 1926 World Championships. There, he helped his Czechoslovakian team to gold in the team competition. He also won gold in the pommel horse, and came in fourth in the individual overall competition, which Peter Sumi won. In the pommel horse, Czechoslovakia won all three medals, with Jan Gajdoš winning silver, and Ladislav Vácha winning bronze.

References

Czech male artistic gymnasts
Date of birth unknown
Date of death unknown